The Team is a hip hop group from Bay Area and Oakland, California. The group consists of four emcees: Clyde Carson, Mayne Mannish, and Kaz Kyzah and also one affiliated member named Jungle. They are associated with West Coast hip hop music, and have a unique sound that showcases the diversity of hyphy music. The group is best known for their local hits "It's Gettin' Hot" (2004) and "Hyphy Juice (The Remix)" (2006). The Team re-gained popularity in late 2005 after dropping the singles "Just Go" and "Bottles Up" to promote their new album, World Premiere, which peaked at number 95 on the Billboard Top R&B/Hip-Hop Albums, and number 50 on the Billboard Top Independent Albums. They are known for their song "Slow Down", which was featured in the 2013 video game Grand Theft Auto V.

Member Clyde Carson has since broken as a solo artist. He has come out with many singles including "Slow Down", "Secret Lover", "Tuk Spot", and "Pour Up", and has featured in songs with rappers such as Andre Nickatina, E-40, Baby Bash, Roach Gigz, The Game, and Too $hort.

Discography
2002: Beyond The Glory (re-released in 2004 as The Preseason)
2004: The Negro League
2006: World Premiere
2012: Hell of A Night EP 
2016: Hell of A Night 2

Solo discography 
Clyde Carson
2001: The Story Vol. 1
2007: Doin' That EP
2009: Bass Rock EP
2012: Something to Speak About
2014: Playboy EP

Kaz Kyzah
2006: The Go-Fessional
2007: Kyzah Kollection

Mayne Mannish
2015: "Guilty Pleasure"

References

External links
Clyde Carson on Twitter
Kaz Kyzah on Twitter
Mayne Mannish on Twitter

Musical groups from Oakland, California
Hip hop groups from California
American musical trios